Robert Britton (born September 22, 1984) is a Canadian former professional cyclist, who rode professionally between 2010 and 2021 for the , ,  and  teams. He won the overall classification of the Tour of the Gila, a race held in New Mexico, in 2015, and 2018.

Major results

2008
 1st  Overall Tour of Walla Walla
1st Stage 1
 2nd Overall Devo Classics Springs Stage Race
1st Stage 1 (ITT)
2009
 1st  Overall Devo Classics Springs Stage Race
1st Stages 2 (ITT) & 3
 1st  Overall Tour of Walla Walla
1st Stage 2 (ITT)
 1st Stage 3 Mount Hood Cycling Classic
2010
 1st Stage 1 McLane Pacific Classic
2011
 1st Stage 1 McLane Pacific Classic
 5th Time trial, Pan-American Road Championships
2012
 1st Stage 2 Tour de Bowness Stage Race
 3rd Overall San Dimas Stage Race
 3rd Bucks County Classic
 10th Overall Tour de Beauce
2014
 2nd Overall Tour de Beauce
 2nd Overall Vuelta a la Independencia Nacional
 3rd Overall Tour of the Gila
2015
 1st  Overall Tour of the Gila
 3rd Overall USA Pro Cycling Challenge
 8th Overall Tour de Beauce
 10th Overall Tour de Taiwan
 10th Overall Tour of California
2016
 3rd Overall Tour of the Gila
 5th Overall Tour of Utah
 7th Overall Tour de Beauce
2017
 1st  Overall Tour of Utah
1st Stage 3 (ITT)
 1st Stage 5 Tour de Beauce
 3rd Time trial, National Road Championships
 4th Overall Joe Martin Stage Race
 5th Overall Tour of the Gila
1st  Mountains classification
 8th Overall Tour of Alberta
2018
 1st  Overall Tour of the Gila
 2nd Time trial, National Road Championships
 5th Overall Tour de Beauce
 9th Overall Colorado Classic
2019
 1st  Time trial, National Road Championships
 10th Overall Tour of Utah

References

External links

1984 births
Living people
Canadian male cyclists
Sportspeople from Regina, Saskatchewan
Cyclists from Saskatchewan